Georges Lemaire (3 April 1905, in Pepinster – 29 September 1933, in Uccle) was a Belgian professional road bicycle racer, who became Belgian road race champion in 1932. In 1933, he finished the Tour de France in 4th place, having worn the yellow jersey for two days. In September 1933, Lemaire made a fatal fall during the Belgian club championship.

Palmarès 

1929
 National Championship, Road, Independents
1932
Brasschaat
 National Championship, Road, Elite
1933
GP Stad Vilvoorde

External links 

1905 births
1933 deaths
People from Pepinster
Belgian male cyclists
Cyclists who died while racing
Sport deaths in Belgium
Cyclists from Liège Province